In mathematics, the Feit–Thompson conjecture is a  conjecture in number theory, suggested by  . The conjecture states that there are no distinct prime numbers p and q such that
 divides .

If the conjecture were true, it would greatly simplify the final chapter of the proof  of the Feit–Thompson theorem that every finite group of odd order is solvable.

It is known that the conjecture is true for q = 3 .

Informal probability arguments suggest that the "expected" number of counterexamples to the Feit–Thompson conjecture is very close to 0, suggesting that the Feit–Thompson conjecture is likely to be true.

See also
Cyclotomic polynomials
Goormaghtigh conjecture

References

External links
  (This article confuses the Feit–Thompson conjecture with the stronger disproved conjecture mentioned above.)

Conjectures
Unsolved problems in number theory